Love on the Rebound is the title of the only album by British band The Dodgers. The music video was directed by Russell Mulcahy and produced by Paul Flattery.

Track listing

Side one
 "Love on the Rebound" (John Wilson)
 "Anytime" (John Wilson, Bob Jackson)
 "For Your Love" (John Wilson)
 "Come Out Fighting" (Paul Hooper)
 "I Call Your Name" (John Wilson, Bob Jackson)
 "Mr. Music" (John Wilson)

Side two
 "Little Darlin'" (Roger Lomas)
 "Don't Know What You're Doing" (Bob Jackson)
 "It Was You" (John Wilson, Bob Jackson)
 "Take Another Piece" (Bob Jackson)
 "Just Wanna Love You" (John Wilson)
 "Don't Let Me Be Wrong" (John Wilson)
 "All I Do" (John Wilson)
 "Das Ende" (Roger Lomas)

Personnel
John Wilson: Guitar, Bass & Vocals
Roger Lomas: Guitar, Bass & Vocals
Bob Jackson: Keyboards, Guitars & Vocals
Paul Hooper: Drums, Percussion & Vocals

Production notes
Recorded at Rockfield Studios

References

Back cover of original LP.

1978 debut albums
Polydor Records albums